General elections were held in Guatemala between 6 and 8 February 1931. In the presidential election Jorge Ubico was elected unopposed, after the remaining sector of the old Liberal Party did not object to his candidacy, whilst the Conservative Party was too disorganised and discredited from the Lázaro Chacón González era to put forward a candidate. Ubico's Progressive Liberal Party, formed by a union of the two wings of the divided Liberal Party also won the parliamentary election unopposed.

Results

President

Congress

References

Bibliography
Villagrán Kramer, Francisco. Biografía política de Guatemala: años de guerra y años de paz. FLACSO-Guatemala, 2004.
Political handbook of the world 1933. New York, 1934.
Dosal, Paul J. Power in transition: the rise of Guatemala's industrial oligarchy, 1871-1994. Westport: Praeger. 1995.
Grieb, Kenneth J. “El gobierno de Jorge Ubico.” Historia general de Guatemala. 1993-1999. Guatemala: Asociación de Amigos del País, Fundación para la Cultura y el Desarrollo. Volume 5 pages 43–60. 1996.
Jones, Chester Lloyd. Guatemala, past and present. New York: Russell and Russell. (Reprint of 1940 edition) 1966.

Elections in Guatemala
Guatemala
1931 in Guatemala
Single-candidate elections
One-party elections
Presidential elections in Guatemala
Election and referendum articles with incomplete results